Euhadra murayamai is a species of air-breathing land snail, a terrestrial pulmonate gastropod mollusk in the family Bradybaenidae. This species is endemic to Japan.

In this species, the gastropod shell is sinistral.

References

Euhadra
Molluscs of Japan
Gastropods described in 1976
Taxonomy articles created by Polbot